Ema Burgić Bucko (born 22 August 1992) is a former professional tennis player from Bosnia.

In her career, she won three singles and eleven doubles titles on the ITF Circuit. On 3 October 2016, she reached her best singles ranking of world No. 466. On 17 October 2016, she peaked at No. 145 in the WTA doubles rankings.

Playing for Bosnia and Herzegovina Fed Cup team, Burgić Bucko has a win–loss record of 8–9.

She won her first tournament on the ITF Circuit in 2008 as a 16-year-old, at a $10k event in La Vall d'Uixó, Spain.

In June 2015, she married fellow tennis player Attila Bucko.

Burgić Bucko announced her retirement from professional tennis in February 2017.

ITF Circuit finals

Singles: 7 (3 titles, 4 runner-ups)

Doubles: 15 (11–4)

References

External links
 
 
 

1992 births
Living people
Sportspeople from Tuzla
Bosnia and Herzegovina female tennis players
Baylor Bears women's tennis players